Hot Country Songs is a chart that ranks the top-performing country music songs in the United States, published by Billboard magazine.  In 2003, 19 different songs topped the chart, then published under the title Hot Country Singles & Tracks, in 52 issues of the magazine, based on weekly airplay data from country music radio stations compiled by Nielsen Broadcast Data Systems.

Singer George Strait's song "She'll Leave You with a Smile" was at number one at the start of the year, having been at the top since the issue dated December 28, 2002.  It remained at number one for one further week in 2003 before being replaced by "19 Somethin'" by Mark Wills. The highest total number of weeks spent at number one by a song in 2003 was the eight achieved by "It's Five O'Clock Somewhere", a collaboration between Alan Jackson and Jimmy Buffett. The duet spent an initial seven weeks at the top, was replaced for a week, and then returned for a final week at number one. The song's first spell at number one tied for the longest unbroken run at the top with "Have You Forgotten?" by Darryl Worley. The success of "It's Five O'Clock Somewhere" gave Buffett his first ever country number one, more than thirty years after he began his singing career.  Another collaboration between a younger star and a music veteran to top the charts in 2003 was "Beer for My Horses" by Toby Keith and Willie Nelson, which spent six weeks at number one and made Nelson, at age 70, the oldest singer to top the chart.  The number one position was dominated by male artists; no solo female singers topped the chart in 2003, although the all-female band Dixie Chicks spent a single week at number one.

Three singers achieved their first number one hits in 2003, Gary Allan with "Man to Man", Joe Nichols with "Brokenheartsville", and Dierks Bentley with "What Was I Thinkin'".  "Brokenheartsville"'s rise to the top benefited from a backlash against previous chart-toppers Dixie Chicks, after the group's lead singer Natalie Maines made controversial comments about then-United States President George W. Bush. This led to a number of radio stations dropping their song "Travelin' Soldier" and thus impacting its chart performance. Allan followed up "Man to Man" with a second number one later in the year with "Tough Little Boys" and was one of only two artists to place multiple songs at the top of the chart in 2003, the other being Keith, whose six weeks at number one with "Beer for My Horses" and five with "I Love This Bar" gave him a total of eleven weeks at number one, the most by any act in 2003. The final number one of the year was "There Goes My Life" by Kenny Chesney.

Chart history

See also
2003 in music
List of artists who reached number one on the U.S. country chart

References

2003
United States country singles
2003 in American music